Helmic, Texas, also known as Alabama Station, is a rural community in Trinity County, Texas on FM 357 12 miles from Groveton. It was originally called Alabama Station,  but the name was changed to Helmic in 1910. The post office closed in 1933. In 2000, the population was 86.

References

Unincorporated communities in Texas